Jacob Laurensz. (c.1560 – 1631), was a Dutch Golden Age brewer and magistrate of Haarlem.

He was owner of the Haarlem brewery "De Lely" and married Mechtelt Simonsdr. in 1584, married a second time in 1613 to Aaf Jacob Witsdr., and married a third time in 1621 to Rachel Adriaensdr.  He was a judge and magistrate of Haarlem and served as captain of the St. George militia from 1612-1615, and colonel 1618-1621. He was portrayed by Frans Hals in The Banquet of the Officers of the St George Militia Company in 1616.

He died in Haarlem.

References

Jacob Laurensz. in De Haarlemse Schuttersstukken, by Jhr. Mr. C.C. van Valkenburg, pp. 66, Haerlem : jaarboek 1958, ISSN 0927-0728, on the website of the North Holland Archives

1560s births
1631 deaths
Frans Hals
Businesspeople from Haarlem
Dutch brewers